Carlos Berlocq and Eduardo Schwank were the defending champions but decided not to participate.
Martín Alund and Horacio Zeballos and defeated Facundo Argüello and Agustín Velotti 7–6(8–6), 6–2 in the final.

Seeds

Draw

Draw

References
 Main Draw

Copa Topper - Doubles
2012 Doubles